Thomas Glynne Davies (12 January 1926 – April 1988), usually known as T. Glynne Davies, was a Welsh poet, novelist and television and radio broadcaster. Davies was born at 64 Denbigh Street, in Llanrwst, Denbighshire, Wales.

Literary achievements

Davies was crowned as a bardd in the 1951 National Eisteddfod in Llanrwst for composing the winning poem Adfeilion ("Ruins").

His other literary output includes the elegy Hedydd yn yr Haul ("Skylark in the sun") (1969) and the epic novel Marged (1974).

Work and legacy
During the Second World War Davies worked at a colliery in Oakdale near Caerphilly, as a Bevin Boy.

Davies worked as a news reporter for BBC Radio from 1957 and presented the popular Welsh language radio programme Bore Da ("Good morning") from 1970 to 1976.

In 2011 Welsh television channel S4C announced the T.Glynne Davies Scholarship for the year 2011–12.

Personal life
T Glynne Davies had four sons, including the composer and broadcaster Gareth Glyn and Geraint Glynne Davies who is a member of the Welsh folk group Ar Log. Geraint is also the founder of Geraint Davies Hearing.

Aled Glynne was the Editor of BBC Radio Cymru before launching Goriad independent production company 

Owen Glynne Davies is a leading puppeteer in the Welsh language and stars in the DVD series "Fflic a Fflac", who has also worked with Vagabondi puppets, Living Daylights, as well as his own company Cwmni Cortyn.

T Glynne Davies died in Cardiff in 1988.

Published works
"Cân serch a storïau eraill", 1954
"Haf creulon: nofel" (novel), 1960
"Llwybrau pridd" (Cerddi cyntaf), 1961
"Hedydd yn yr haul", 1969
"Marged", 1974
"Gwilym Cowlyd, 1828-1904", 1976
"Cerddi", 1987

External links
BBC website biography (in Welsh)
Penmon: Thomas Glynne Davies – extensive family tribute site.

References

1926 births
1988 deaths
Crowned bards
Welsh radio presenters
People from Denbighshire
Bevin Boys
20th-century Welsh poets
Welsh miners